Jonathan David Melvoin (December 6, 1961 – July 12, 1996) was an American musician, active in the 1980s and 1990s.

Early life
He was the son of Constance (née Ives) and Mike Melvoin, keyboardist for The Wrecking Crew, and brother of twins Susannah and Wendy Melvoin of Prince and The Revolution. He first learned to play drums at the age of five.

Career
Melvoin performed with many punk bands in the 1990s, such as The Dickies. He was also a member of The Family, a Prince side project band which produced the original recording of "Nothing Compares 2 U", "Screams of Passion" and "Mutiny", and made musical contributions to many Wendy & Lisa projects, as well as to Prince and the Revolution's 1985 album Around the World in a Day. He also played drums on "Do U Lie?" from the 1986 Prince & the Revolution album Parade. At the time of his death he was the touring keyboardist for The Smashing Pumpkins during their worldwide tour for the album Mellon Collie and the Infinite Sadness.

Death
Melvoin died at age 34 as the result of a heroin overdose. Melvoin injected high purity heroin that was intended for snorting, he had previously consumed alcohol, which can lower the body's drug tolerance. The Smashing Pumpkins were not invited to Melvoin's funeral. Pumpkins drummer Jimmy Chamberlin injected the same heroin that night. Yet despite rumors of injecting together, after acquiring the drugs, both musicians retired to their own rooms to use alone. Several songs were inspired by his death, including the Sarah McLachlan song "Angel", the Wendy & Lisa song "Jonathan" (as Girl Bros.), and Prince's "The Love We Make" from the album Emancipation.

References

External links

 

1961 births
1996 deaths
Musicians from Los Angeles
Deaths by heroin overdose in New York (state)
American rock keyboardists
The Smashing Pumpkins members
20th-century American keyboardists
Drug-related deaths in New York City